Ludger Forest may refer to:
 Ludger Forest (MLA for L'Assomption) (1826–1903), member of the Legislative Assembly of Quebec for L'Assomption electoral district
 Ludger Forest (MLA for Sherbrooke) (1877–1943), his nephew, member of the Legislative Assembly of Quebec for Sherbrooke electoral district